Ernesto Paternò Castello di Carcaci (7 August 1882 – 9 April 1971) was Lieutenant of the Sovereign Military Order of Malta from 1955 to 1962 (succeeding Antonio Hercolani Fava Simonetti). In 1962 Paternò retired from the post on the election of Angelo de Mojana di Cologna as Grand Master.

1882 births
1971 deaths
Lieutenants of the Sovereign Military Order of Malta
Grand Crosses 1st class of the Order of Merit of the Federal Republic of Germany